The Fujifilm X-T2 is a DSLR-style weather-resistant mirrorless camera announced by Fujifilm on July 7, 2016. It uses the Fujifilm X-mount and is a successor to the Fujifilm X-T1. Sales of the camera began on September 8, 2016. On September 6, 2018, Fujifilm announced its successor, the X-T3.

A Graphite Silver edition was released in February 2017.

The X-T3 succeeds the X-T2. The new camera was announced on September 6, 2018.

Precise operation
Mechanical dials are provided for key operations, including shutter speed, ISO sensitivity, exposure compensation, drive modes and metering modes. For the prevention of operation errors, the dials for shutter speed and ISO sensitivity are equipped with a Lock & Release button, and are designed with extra height for operability improvement over the Fujifilm X-T1.

References

External links 
 

X-T2
Cameras introduced in 2016